Bobtown is an unincorporated coal town and census-designated place (CDP) in Greene County, Pennsylvania, United States. As of the 2010 census it had a population of 757.

History 

Bobtown was founded by the Shannopin Coal Co in the 1920s to provide housing for miners who worked in the company's mine which was located nearby. The town is named for Robert "Bob" Mapel, who was also the founder of nearby Mapletown.

Geography

Demographics

As of the census of 2000, there were 742 people, 340 households, and 207 families residing in the town.

The racial makeup of the township was 95.5% White, 1.4% Hispanic, 0.4% Black, 0.3% Native American, and 2.1% from two or more races.

There were 322 households, out of which 23.3% had children under the age of 18 living with them, 50.3% were married couples living together, 10.6% had a female householder with no husband present, and 33.5% were non-families. 28.9% of all households were made up of individuals, and 28.9% had someone living alone who was 65 years of age or older.  The average household size was 2.41 and the average family size was 2.95.

The town population was spread out, with 20.1% under the age of 18, 9.4% from 18 to 24, 24.6% from 25 to 44, 21.5% from 45 to 64, and 24.4% who were 65 years of age or older. The median age was 41.7 years.

The median income for a household in the town was $40,038, and the average income for a household was $54,545.

Climate

Chevron gas well explosion 

On February 11, 2014, Chevron's Lanco 7H well caught fire and burned for several days. The well is located about one mile west of Bobtown on Bald Hill Church Road. The explosion killed contractor Ian McKee, a field service technician for Cameron International, and slightly injured another worker. Chevron representatives distributed pizza coupons to residents as compensation for traffic caused by emergency responders and press. The pizza issue gained national attention from various media outlets, including Comedy Central's The Daily Show which interviewed the owners of Bobtown Pizza.

Education
Bobtown is served by Southeastern Greene School District and is the location of Bobtown Elementary School.

Media

Television

Infrastructure

Utilities 
Electric service is provided by West Penn Power, natural gas services by Dominion Resources, Water by East Dunkard Water Association and sewage by the dunkard-bobtown municipal authority.

Cable television and cable Internet are provided by Atlantic Broadband. Landline telephone and DSL services are offered by Windstream Communications.

Trash pickup in the Bobtown area is provided by Preferable Sanitation.

Notable person
 Cyril Wecht, American forensic pathologist

References

Further reading 
 A History of Bobtown, by Musick, Eleanor (Flenniken Public Library, 1987)
 The Story of Bobtown : The Road to the Top of the Hill, by Bennett, Robert S

External links
 Southeastern Greene School District
 BOBTOWN, Pa. – SHANNOPIN MINE

Census-designated places in Greene County, Pennsylvania
Coal towns in Pennsylvania